The greater short-tailed gerbil (Dipodillus maghrebi) is a rodent found mainly in Morocco.

References

  Database entry includes a brief justification of why this species is of least concern
Musser, G. G. and M. D. Carleton. 2005. Superfamily Muroidea. pp. 894–1531 in Mammal Species of the World a Taxonomic and Geographic Reference. D. E. Wilson and D. M. Reeder eds. Johns Hopkins University Press, Baltimore.

Dipodillus
Rodents of North Africa
Endemic fauna of Morocco
Mammals described in 1972
Taxobox binomials not recognized by IUCN